The men's omnium event at the 2020 Summer Olympics took place on 5 August 2021 at the Izu Velodrome. 20 cyclists from 20 nations competed.

Background
This was the 3rd appearance of the event, which was introduced in 2012.

The previous reigning Olympic champion was Elia Viviani of Italy. The reigning (2020) World Champion was Benjamin Thomas of France.

France, Italy, Russia, Germany, China, Great Britain, Australia, and the Netherlands are traditionally strong track cycling nations.

Qualification

A National Olympic Committee (NOC) could enter up to 1 cyclist in the omnium. Quota places are allocated to the NOC, which selects the cyclists. Qualification is entirely through the 2018–20 UCI nation rankings. The best 8 NOCs in the madison rankings (not already qualified through the team pursuit) directly qualified to enter madison teams as well as earning 1 quota place in the omnium. There were another 12 places in the omnium available based on the omnium rankings; NOCs qualified through the madison were not eligible. Each continent was guaranteed at least one place in the omnium. Because qualification was complete by the end of the 2020 UCI Track Cycling World Championships on 1 March 2020 (the last event that contributed to the 2018–20 rankings), qualification was unaffected by the COVID-19 pandemic.

Competition format

An omnium is a multiple-race event. The current event features four different types of races. The format has changed significantly from 2016, with three of the six race types dropped and one replacement added. The omnium also moved from a two-day format in prior Games to a one-day format in 2020. The winner of the omnium is the cyclist who obtains the most points through the four races. The winner of each of the first three races earns 40 points, the second-place cyclist earns 38, the third-place rider 36, and so forth. The final race has special scoring rules. The races in the omnium are:

 Scratch race: Mass start race; first to finish is the winner. Distance is 10 km (40 laps).
 Tempo race: The new race for 2020. The distance is 10 km (40 laps). After the first 5 laps, the winner of each lap earns 1 point. Lapping the field earns 20 points. The winner of the race is the cyclist with the most points (the points earned within the tempo race do not count for the omnium total; they are used only to place cyclists for the race).
 Elimination race: Every 2 laps, the last-place cyclist is eliminated.
 Points race: A 25 km (100 lap) points race, with points earned for sprints (5/3/2/1, every 10 laps with double points for final sprint) and for lapping the field (20 points).

There is only one round of competition.

Schedule
All times are Japan Standard Time (UTC+9)

Results

Scratch race

Tempo race

Elimination race

Points race and final standings

References

Men's omnium
Cycling at the Summer Olympics – Men's omnium
Men's events at the 2020 Summer Olympics